Hopurlu (also, Khopurlu and Opurly) is a village in the Kalbajar Rayon of Azerbaijan.

References 

Populated places in Kalbajar District